George Burton Adams (June 3, 1851 in Vermont – May 26, 1925) was an American medievalist historian who taught at Yale University from 1888 to 1925. He was noted for his written works as well as his 1908 address as president of the American Historical Association, which lamented the encroachment of the social sciences on the field of history, a position later challenged by James Harvey Robinson. He also played a key role in the establishment of the American Historical Review. Adams was elected a member of the American Antiquarian Society in 1899, and a fellow of the American Academy of Arts and Sciences in 1918.

Works
Civilization during the Middle Ages (1894)
Growth of the French Nation (1896)
The History of England; From the Norman Conquest to the Death of John (1066–1216) 1905
Constitutional History of England (1921)

References

External links

History and the Philosophy of History, 1908 Presidential Address at the American Historical Association
George Burton Adams Papers (MS 30). Manuscripts and Archives, Yale University Library.

1851 births
1925 deaths
American medievalists
Yale University faculty
Presidents of the American Historical Association
Fellows of the American Academy of Arts and Sciences
Members of the American Antiquarian Society